James Flowers may refer to:

 James Clayton Flowers (born 1915), member of the Tuskegee Airmen
 J. Christopher Flowers, American private equity investor and investment manager